Crystal City is an unincorporated community recognized as a local urban district in the Municipality of Louise within the Canadian province of Manitoba. It held village status prior to January 1, 2015. It is located on Highway 3, 16 kilometres north of the Canada–United States border and 200 kilometres southwest of Winnipeg.

In summer 1878, Thomas Greenway, who would later serve in the Manitoba Legislature and become Premier of Manitoba, traveled to the region. During the following winter, he organized the Rock Lake Colonization Co. In summer 1879, the party of eight men arrived at Crystal Creek. By 1882, Crystal City was a substantial town. The earliest newspaper reference is for the land development that year.

The community was moved near the railway, which is no longer in use, for more attraction. The local school is named after him: Thomas Greenway Middle School (TGMS). TGMS has grades 5–8, and the Crystal City Early Years School (CCEY) has grades K-4.

The community has a rich heritage as a thriving agricultural service centre. Since the 1960s, Crystal City has had to adapt to changes brought about by the trend toward larger farms and an aging population.

Demographics 

Attractions 
The Crystal City Printing Museum, open on a full-time basis, is designated as a Provincial Heritage Site.

See also
 Sarles–Crystal City Border Crossing

References 

Designated places in Manitoba
Former villages in Manitoba
Local urban districts in Manitoba
Populated places disestablished in 2015
2015 disestablishments in Manitoba